Walter Louis Miecznikowski (22 April 1877 — 1941) was an English footballer who played as a left winger.

Football career
Miecznikowski began his career at Framlingham College, playing for the college's football team in the Suffolk Senior Cup side whilst studying. Miecznikowski proceeded to play for Pemberton, signing for Clapton in 1899. In 1901, Miecznikowski was playing in the Football League for Notts County, whilst retaining his registration with Clapton. Later that year, Miecznikowski signed for Portsmouth, playing with the club for two years. In 1903, Miecznikowski signed for West Ham United. Miecznikowski made three appearances for West Ham, signing for Fulham later that year. In 1904, after a single season at Fulham, Miecznikowski signed for newly formed club Southern United.

Cricket career
Alongside football, Miecznikowski was a keen cricketer, playing for Middlesex County Cricket Club's second XI. In summer 1908, Miecznikowski hit 200 not out against Fulham Cricket Club for Honor Oak Cricket Club.

Personal life
Miecznikowski's brother, Edward, played alongside him for Clapton and Southern United.

Following his retirement from football, Miecznikowski worked as private secretary to Alexandra of Denmark.

References

1877 births
1941 deaths
English people of Polish descent
Footballers from Paddington
English cricketers
Association football midfielders
People educated at Framlingham College
English footballers
Clapton F.C. players
Notts County F.C. players
Portsmouth F.C. players
West Ham United F.C. players
Fulham F.C. players
Southern United F.C. players
Middlesex cricketers
English Football League players
Southern Football League players